Don't Fence Me In is the third studio album by the American country music artist Lari White, released in 1996. The album produced two chart singles on the Billboard Hot Country Singles & Tracks (now Hot Country Songs) charts: "Ready, Willing, and Able", which peaked at #20, and "Wild at Heart", which peaked at #56.

Content
"Ready, Willing, and Able" was previously cut by Daron Norwood on his 1995 album of the same name.

"Wild at Heart" subject to controversy due to its music video. Said video was withdrawn from CMT and The Nashville Network after only a month due to protests from mental health organizations. The video featured White as a patient in a psychiatric hospital, encouraging the other patients to start dancing.

Track listing

Personnel
Compiled from liner notes.

Musicians
 Al Anderson — electric guitar
 Bill Cuomo — keyboards
 Dan Dugmore — steel guitar, Dobro
 Glen Duncan — fiddle, mandolin
 Sonny Garrish — steel guitar
 Steve Gibson — banjo
 Rob Hajacos — fiddle
 Mike Henderson — National slide guitar
 John Hobbs — keyboards
 Dann Huff — electric guitar
 Josh Leo — electric guitar
 Carl Marsh — keyboards, strings
 Gary Morse — steel guitar
 Steve Nathan — keyboards
 Don Potter — acoustic guitar
 Harry Stinson — drums, percussion
 Steuart Smith — electric guitar
 Biff Watson — acoustic guitar
 Willie Weeks — bass guitar
 Lari White — lead vocals
 Lonnie Wilson — drums, percussion
 Glenn Worf — bass guitar
 Reese Wynans — keyboards

Backing vocalists
Max Carl
Vince Gill
Kim Keyes
Mark Luna
Shelby Lynne on "Don't Fence Me In"
Stephony Smith
Harry Stinson
Trisha Yearwood on "Don't Fence Me In"
Lari White

Technical
Josh Leo — producer
Steve Marcantonio — recording, mixing
Denny Purcell — mastering
Lari White — producer

Chart performance

References

1996 albums
RCA Records albums
Lari White albums
Albums produced by Josh Leo
Albums produced by Lari White